Simeon Monev (born 10 July 1957) is a Bulgarian modern pentathlete. He competed at the 1980 Summer Olympics, finishing in 28th place.

References

1957 births
Living people
Bulgarian male modern pentathletes
Olympic modern pentathletes of Bulgaria
Modern pentathletes at the 1980 Summer Olympics